The Kalinin K-6 was a mail-plane designed by Konstantin Alekseevič Kalinin.  It was an aircraft largely derived from the previous Kalinin K-5, which shared its wing, tail and landing gear.  This aircraft differed from the previous one by the new fuselage design, which was slender and had a four-meter compartment for the load (370 kg).  The K-6 flew for the first time in 1930 but remained at the prototype stage, since mass production was never authorised.

Specifications (K-6)

References

1930s Soviet and Russian airliners
Kalinin aircraft